Kevin Dawson may refer to:

 Kevin Dawson (footballer, born 1981), English footballer
 Kevin Dawson (footballer, born 1990), Irish footballer
 Kevin Dawson (footballer, born 1992), Uruguayan footballer
 Kevin Dawson (cyclist) in British National Time Trial Championships